Robert James Wilson (20 September 1840 – 15 May 1897) was an English Anglican priest and academic, who was Warden of Keble College, Oxford, from 1889 until his death.

Wilson was born in Broadwater, Sussex, England and educated at Cheltenham College and Merton College, Oxford. He was appointed as a Fellow of the college in 1867, retaining this position until 1889.  He was ordained in the Church of England in 1868, and served as vicar of Wolvercote, Oxfordshire, from 1875 to 1879, when he became Warden of Radley College (until 1888); he was also vicar of Radley from 1880 to 1893. In 1889, he was appointed Warden of Keble College, Oxford, and made an Honorary Fellow of Merton.  He died on 15 May 1897. His writings included joint authorship (with Henry Parry Liddon) of a biography of Edward Bouverie Pusey, one of the leaders of the Oxford Movement.

References

1840 births
1897 deaths
19th-century English Anglican priests
Alumni of Merton College, Oxford
Fellows of Merton College, Oxford
Wardens of Keble College, Oxford
Wardens of Radley College
People educated at Cheltenham College